Lechi Baymarzayevich Sadulayev (born 8 January 2000) is a Russian football player who plays for FC Akhmat Grozny in the Russian Premier League. He is deployed in a variety of positions, mostly as an attacking midfielder, but also as a wide midfielder or winger on right or left side of the field.

Club career
He made his debut in the Russian Premier League for FC Akhmat Grozny on 10 December 2018 in a game against FC Arsenal Tula as a 90th-minute substitute for Magomed Mitrishev.

International career
Sadulayev was called up to the Russia national football team for the first time in November 2022 for friendly games against Tajikistan and Uzbekistan. He made his debut against Tajikistan on 17 November 2022.

Personal life
Sadulayev is an ethnic Chechen.

Career statistics

Club

International

References

External links
 
 
 

2000 births
People from Kurchaloyevsky District
Sportspeople from Chechnya
Living people
Russian footballers
Russia youth international footballers
Russia international footballers
Association football midfielders
FC Akhmat Grozny players
Russian Premier League players
21st-century Russian people